Kapana is a way of preparing raw meat, typically beef, in Namibia by grilling it on an open fire. The grilled meat is often sold at stalls in open markets; it is cut into small pieces and grilled and sold while it is cooking. People from all walks of life come and enjoy the meat. There are often many people selling it at one place, so the price is always negotiable. Kapana business has contributed in a small way to the economic development of the country by giving unemployed young people an opportunity to start their business with a very low capital and look after their family. The township of Katutura in Windhoek is known for its kapana.

Preparation

 
A metal plate is welded into a grill stand with a flat top and the wood burns under it. The Kapana men (as they are called, although a few women also make their living this way), cut the raw meat with a machete into smaller pieces, and prepare the chili sauce with onions, tomatoes and spices. When the top is hot enough, the meat is placed on the grill, and the men begin calling for customers.  To save meat and money, a Kapana man only throws on the grill a small amount of meat to attract customers to his stand.  When they arrive, he will then put more to satisfy them.  The cooking time is five to ten minutes, and the sauce is already made, so each customer enjoys freshly grilled juicy Kapana.  Kapana can also be made with pork, but it is more expensive.

Culture

 
Kapana is inexpensive to buy and fast to cook. The area around the Kapana stand is regarded as a social place, meeting new people of varying economic backgrounds while enjoying the lunch. Although most people could grill beef at home, many prefer to go and eat Kapana while having conversation and making new friends.

Kapana traders compete noisily for customers, each shouting and claiming that his meat is the best cooked.

In 2014, a drought in Namibia meant that the farms that traditionally provided meat to the Kapana men could not keep up with the demand.  Kapana meat had to be shipped from afar, increasing the price and making it difficult for the men to make a profit.

See also
 Barbecue
 Namibia
 Namibian cuisine
 African cuisine
 West African cuisine
 List of African cuisines

References 

Namibian cuisine
Beef dishes